Fires of Kuwait is a 1992 American documentary film on the Kuwaiti oil fires directed by David Douglas. It was nominated for an Academy Award for Best Documentary Feature. The film was the winner of the 2005 Hall of Fame Award from Giant Screen Cinema Association. The documentary focuses on the international effort to extinguish Kuwait's burning oilfields in the aftermath of the Gulf War.

References

External links
Fires of Kuwait at IMAX

1992 films
1990s short documentary films
American short documentary films
Documentary films about disasters
Documentary films about Kuwait
Documentary films about petroleum
Documentary films about war
Films scored by Michael Brook
Films directed by David Douglas (director)
Films shot in Kuwait
Fires in Kuwait
Gulf War films
IMAX documentary films
IMAX short films
1990s English-language films
1990s American films